Venkat Renganathan  (born May 12, 1986) is an Indian Tamil actor who works in Tamil TV series. He is known for portraying Jeeva in Pandian Stores. Venkat Renganathan is married and has a daughter.

Television

Filmography

Awards

References

External links 
 

Tamil television actors
Tamil actors
1989 births
Living people